The Palau cicadabird (Edolisoma monacha) is a species of bird in the family Campephagidae. It is endemic to Palau. It was previously considered conspecific with the common cicadabird. Its natural habitat is subtropical or tropical moist lowland forest.

References

Palau cicadabird
Palau cicadabird